Richard Allen Wingo (born July 16, 1956) is an American Republican politician and a former American football linebacker in the National Football League. He played five seasons for the Green Bay Packers from 1979 to 1984. He was drafted by the Packers in the seventh round of the 1979 NFL Draft out of the University of Alabama.

He was a part of one of the most famous plays in college football history, "The Goal Line Stand" in Alabama's Sugar Bowl victory over Penn State in 1979. He played for college coach Paul "Bear" Bryant. From Pee Wee football through high school, he led every team he played for in tackles.

Wingo is the only player in Packers history to have a scoring total of 1 point. On September 6, 1981, against the Chicago Bears, he caught a pass in the end zone for a successful point-after-touchdown after a botched place-kick attempt. (At the time, either a successful place-kick or advancing the ball into the end zone both counted for one point.)

Wingo served as strength coach at Alabama under former head coach Bill Curry.

He lives in Tuscaloosa, Alabama, and has two sons: Jake and Luke.

In 2014 Wingo ran for a seat in the Alabama House of Representatives, winning the general election in November. He was sworn into office in 2015.

References

1956 births
Living people
Alabama Crimson Tide football players
Green Bay Packers players
American football linebackers
Republican Party members of the Alabama House of Representatives
21st-century American politicians